František Kordač (11 January 1852, Seletice – 26 April 1934, Prague-Zbraslav) was a Czech Roman Catholic clergyman. He was Archbishop of Prague from 1919 to 1931.

External links
http://www.catholic-hierarchy.org/bishop/bkordac.html

Roman Catholic bishops of Prague
1852 births
1934 deaths
Burials at St. Vitus Cathedral
People from Nymburk District